This is a list of Estonian television related events from 2003.

Events
8 February - Claire's Birthday are selected to represent Estonia at the 2003 Eurovision Song Contest with their song "Eighties Coming Back". They are selected to be the ninth Estonian Eurovision entry during Eurolaul held at the ETV Studios in Tallinn.

Debuts

Television shows

1990s
Õnne 13 (1993–present)

Ending this year

Births

Deaths
23 January – Heikki Haravee (born 1924), actor
23 February – Helle-Reet Helenurm (born 1944), actress